Gilbert Trần Chánh Chiếu (1868-1919) was a Vietnamese independence activist and the subject of "l'Affaire Gilbert Chieu". He used his French citizenship and his position as hotel owner, businessman, editor of the Saigon Quốc Ngữ newspaper Lục Tỉnh Tân Văn and the French version Le Moniteur des Provinces, as well as being one of the first attorneys at law in Saigon, to cover for the fact that he was in fact an agent of the Duy Tân Hội society based in Japan and led by Vietnamese revolutionaries Phan Bội Châu and Prince Cường Để. At the end of October 1908, a series of 40 arrests was made, including Chieu himself, but at trial evidence proved insufficient to convict.

References

20th-century Vietnamese lawyers
1868 births
1919 deaths